Arvas, formerly known as Örth,  is a Norwegian black metal band formed in Bergen in 1993 as a one-man project by multi musician V-Rex. In Summer 1996, Borknagar drummer Grim and Gorgoroth bassist Ares joined the band. They recorded an album in late 1996, titled Nocturno Inferno, but it was never released. After Grim committed suicide in 1999, V-Rex decided to keep on going as a one-man project, but changed the band's name. He recorded two demos, Countless Souls at Dawn and I Am Thy Grief, and a split album with Hordagaard titled Dawn of Satan/Uncle Satan, which was released by Azermedoth Records. The band's first official album Blessed from Below – Ad Sathanas Noctum was released in 2010 by the band themselves. Their second album Into The Realm Of The Occult was released in November 2013 by Italian label ATMF Records, to be followed in March 2015 by Black Satanic Mysticism, via Aeternitas Tenebrarum Music Foundation. Arvas has shared stages with bands like Throne of Katarsis, Urgehal, Dauden, 1349, Mongo Ninja, Nocturnal Breed. In March 2013, Arvas toured the east European countries supporting Deicide on their 'End Of The World Tour'. The band's fourth album, Black Path, was released on 24 March 2017 by Mighty Music.

Members
V-Rex – vocals, Rhythm/lead guitars, programming and synths (since 1993), drums and bass (since 1999)
Jarl Brynhildsvold - Bass 2018-present
Kristoffer Lunden - Drums 2018-present
Roald Floberg - Rhythm Guitar 2019-present

Past live members
Aindiachai (Taake) - guitar
Hexzaldre (Lysbryter/Vithr) - bass
Tivillius - bass
LB (Vithr/Among Gods) - guitar
Stürm – guitars
Bloodlust - guitar
Vhred Obsternas – bass
Drakamer - vocals
Malignant - bass

Former members
Grim – drums (1993–1997)
Ares – bass (1993–1997)
Fordervelse - drums (2009-2015)
Coldbound - Vocals (2015-2017)
Snuff X - Drums (2014-2017)
Kvalvaag - Bass (2014-2017)
Stürm - Guitars (2012-2017)
Hexzaldre - Vocals (2015-?)

Discography

Studio albums/promos
Nocturno Inferno (1996, as Örth) (Released on 7 April 2017)
Promo 09 (2009)
Dawn of Satan/Uncle Satan (split with Hordagaard) (2008)
Blessed from Below – Ad Sathanas Noctum (2010)
Into The Realm Of The Occult (2013)
Black Satanic Mysticism (2015)
 Black Path (2017)

Demos
Countless Souls at Dawn
I Am Thy Grief

References

Norwegian black metal musical groups
Musical groups established in 1993
1993 establishments in Norway